Picco Muzio is a minor summit below the Matterhorn on the Furggen ridge. Because of its prominence on that ridge, it was included in the 'enlarged list' of alpine four-thousanders.

References

External links 
 List of Alpine four-thousanders

Alpine four-thousanders
Mountains of the Alps
Mountains of Valais
Mountains of Italy
Pennine Alps
Italy–Switzerland border
International mountains of Europe
Matterhorn
Mountains of Switzerland
Four-thousanders of Switzerland